Dehnhaide is an elevated rapid transit station located in the Hamburg district of Barmbek-Süd, Germany. The station was opened in 1912 and is served by Hamburg U-Bahn line U3.

Service

Trains 
Dehnhaide is served by Hamburg U-Bahn line U3; departures are every 5 minutes. The travel time to Hamburg Hauptbahnhof takes about 10 minutes.

Gallery

See also 

 List of Hamburg U-Bahn stations

References

External links 

 Line and route network plans at hvv.de 

Hamburg U-Bahn stations in Hamburg
U3 (Hamburg U-Bahn) stations
Buildings and structures in Hamburg-Nord
Railway stations in Germany opened in 1912